The Stanford Encyclopedia of Philosophy (SEP) combines an online encyclopedia of philosophy with peer-reviewed publication of original papers in philosophy, freely accessible to Internet users. It is maintained by Stanford University. Each entry is written and maintained by an expert in the field, including professors from many academic institutions worldwide. Authors contributing to the encyclopedia give Stanford University the permission to publish the articles, but retain the copyright to those articles.

Approach and history
As of August 5th, 2022, the SEP has 1,774 published entries. Apart from its online status, the encyclopedia uses the traditional academic approach of most encyclopedias and academic journals to achieve quality by means of specialist authors selected by an editor or an editorial committee that is competent (although not necessarily considered specialists) in the field covered by the encyclopedia and peer review.

The encyclopedia was created in 1995 by Edward N. Zalta, with the explicit aim of providing a dynamic encyclopedia that is updated regularly, and so does not become dated in the manner of conventional print encyclopedias. The charter for the encyclopedia allows for rival articles on a single topic to reflect reasoned disagreements among scholars. Initially, the SEP was developed with U.S. public funding from the National Endowment for the Humanities and the National Science Foundation. A long-term fundraising plan to preserve open access to the encyclopedia is supported by many university libraries and library consortia.  These institutions contribute under a plan devised by the SEP in collaboration with the Scholarly Publishing and Academic Resources Coalition, the International Coalition of Library Consortia, and the Southeastern Library Network, with matching funding from the National Endowment for the Humanities.

See also
 Encyclopedia of Philosophy
 Internet Encyclopedia of Philosophy
 Nelson's Perpetual Loose Leaf Encyclopaedia
 Routledge Encyclopedia of Philosophy
 List of online encyclopedias

References

External links
 
 Official mirror websites:
 Stanford Encyclopedia of Philosophy mirror from the Institute for Logic, Language and Computation of the University of Amsterdam
 Stanford Encyclopedia of Philosophy mirror from University of Sydney Library

Encyclopedias of philosophy
Encyclopedia of Philosophy
Internet properties established in 1995
1995 establishments in the United States
American online encyclopedias
Articles containing video clips
20th-century encyclopedias
Philosophy websites